Magdeburg is an electoral constituency (German: Wahlkreis) represented in the Bundestag. It elects one member via first-past-the-post voting. Under the current constituency numbering system, it is designated as constituency 69. It is located in central Saxony-Anhalt, comprising the city of Magdeburg and northeastern parts of Salzlandkreis district.

Magdeburg was created for the inaugural 1990 federal election after German reunification. Since 2021, it has been represented by Martin Kröber of the Social Democratic Party (SPD).

Geography
Magdeburg is located in central Saxony-Anhalt. As of the 2021 federal election, it comprises the independent city of Magdeburg as well as the municipalities of Barby, Bördeland, Calbe, and Schönebeck from the Salzlandkreis district.

History
Magdeburg was created after German reunification in 1990. In the 1990 through 1998 elections, it was constituency 286 in the numbering system. In the 2002 and 2005 elections, it was number 69. In the 2009 election, it was number 70. Since the 2013 election, it has been number 69.

Originally, the constituency comprised the city of Magdeburg without the quarters of Buckau, Fermersleben, Salbke, Westerhüsen, Leipziger Straße, Hopfengarten, and Reform. In the 2002 and 2005 elections, it was coterminous with the city of Magdeburg. In the 2009 election, it acquired the area of the former Schönebeck district, now part of Salzlandkreis district. The constituency acquired its current borders in the 2013 election.

Members
The constituency was first represented by Klaus Mildner of the Christian Democratic Union (CDU) from 1990 to 1994. Uwe Küster of the Social Democratic Party (SPD) was elected in 1994 and served until 2009. In the 2009 election, Rosemarie Hein of The Left was elected representative. Tino Sorge of the CDU was elected in 2013, and re-elected in 2017. Martin Kröber regained it for the SPD in 2021.

Election results

2021 election

2017 election

2013 election

2009 election

References

Federal electoral districts in Saxony-Anhalt
1990 establishments in Germany
Constituencies established in 1990
Magdeburg